Izet Sarajlić (16 March 1930 in Doboj – 2 May 2002 in Sarajevo) was a Bosnian historian of philosophy, essayist, translator and poet. Sarajlić was Bosnia and Herzegovina's best-known poet after World War II, and the former Yugoslavia's most widely translated poet.

Biography
Sarajlić was born in Doboj in 1930. His mother was not yet eighteen when she married his father, a railway worker. Sarajlić's childhood was spent in Trebinje and Dubrovnik; he moved to Sarajevo in 1945, where he would remain for the rest of his life.

In Sarajevo, Sarajlić attended the boys’ gymnasium, and would enter the world of Yugoslav poetry at age nineteen with the collection, "U susretu" ("In meeting"). He graduated with a degree in philosophy at the University of Sarajevo's department of philosophy and comparative literature, later receiving a doctorate in philosophical sciences. During his studies at university, Sarajlić worked as a journalist.

After graduating, Sarajlić became a full-time professor at the Faculty of Philosophy in Sarajevo, a position he would hold for the rest of his life. He was a member of both the Academy of Sciences and Arts of Bosnia and Herzegovina and the Writers' Society of Bosnia and Herzegovina, as well as the association of intellectuals, "Krug 99" ("Circle 99"). Together with Husein Tahmiščić, Ahmet Hromadžić, Velimir Milošević and Vladimir Čerkez, he founded "Sarajevo Poetry Days" as an international book festival in 1962.

During his lengthy career, Sarajlić published over 30 books of poetry, some of which have been translated into fifteen languages, as well as numerous memoirs, political writings and translations.

Sarajlić's manuscript "Sarajevo War Journal," written during the first weeks of the siege of Sarajevo, was published in 1993 in Slovenia. When talking about it, Sarajlić would say, "This is the only collection of which I can say that I would love never to have written it."

Sarajlić is reported to have believed that he "belonged to the 20th century." When the 21st century arrived, he would date letters to friends as "1999+1," "1999+2," etc.

He died in Sarajevo on 2 May 2002, at the age of 72.

His literary work is a part of common heritage of Serbs, Croats, Montenegrins and Bosniaks.

References

External links
Izet Sarajlić on ezgeta.com

1930 births
2002 deaths
Writers from Sarajevo
People from Doboj
Bosniaks of Bosnia and Herzegovina
Bosnia and Herzegovina poets
Bosniak writers
Bosniak poets
Bosnia and Herzegovina historians of philosophy
20th-century poets